Colin Campbell (2 January 1918 – 18 October 2003) was an Australian rules footballer who played with Collingwood in the Victorian Football League (VFL).

Notes

External links 

1918 births
2003 deaths
Collingwood Football Club players
Preston Football Club (VFA) players
Australian rules footballers from Melbourne
People from Thornbury, Victoria